Optimystix Entertainment India Pvt. Ltd. (also known as Optimystix Media) is an Indian television and film production studio founded by Vipul D Shah and Sanjiv Sharma. It primarily produces various types of programming and content for Indian television and is most known for involvement in Indian Idol, Comedy Circus, and Crime Patrol among others.

In February 2020, Optimystix Entertainment and Ashwin Varde entered into a strategic partnership to launch Wakaoo Films with an aim to produce feature films, web series, and web films.

List of productions 
The following is an incomplete list of productions

Current shows

Former shows

Fiction

Non-fiction and reality

Specials and award telecasts

Telefilms

References 

Indian film studios
Entertainment companies of India
Television production companies of India
Companies based in Mumbai
Television series by Optimystix Entertainment
Indian companies established in 2000
2000 establishments in Maharashtra